Ephraimite may refer to :

 a member of the Tribe of Ephraim
 Ephraimite (coin), debased coinage issued by Frederick the Great